The Cathedral of the Immaculate Conception, also known as St. Mary's Cathedral, is a Catholic cathedral in Wichita, Kansas, United States.  It is the seat of the Diocese of Wichita.

The first Catholic church was constructed in Wichita in 1872. The cathedral parish was founded in 1887. The present cathedral church was begun in 1906 and it was consecrated on September 19, 1912. It was designed by Emmanuel Louis Masqueray. Cardinal James Gibbons of Baltimore dedicated the church in the presence of 30 other Catholic bishops. Archbishop John J. Glennon of St. Louis delivered the sermon. The cathedral was built at a cost of $500,000. The building was constructed of Bedford stone. The dome is  feet from the ground. The bronze doors, which were designed and created Domus Dei of Italy, were installed in 1997.

See also
List of Catholic cathedrals in the United States
List of cathedrals in the United States

References

External links
 Official Cathedral Site
Roman Catholic Diocese of Wichita Official Site

Roman Catholic churches completed in 1912
Immaculate Conception, Wichita
Churches in the Roman Catholic Diocese of Wichita
Churches in Wichita, Kansas
Renaissance Revival architecture in Kansas
1912 establishments in Kansas
20th-century Roman Catholic church buildings in the United States